The Society of Health and Physical Educators, known as SHAPE America, is an American organization that provides support to professionals in health, physical education, recreation and dance.

SHAPE America has had six previous names, most recently the American Alliance for Health, Physical Education, Recreation and Dance (AAHPERD), and previously the American Association for Health, Physical Education and Recreation (AAHPER).

Related and/or sister organizations
American Association for Health, Physical Education, and Recreation (AAHPER)
American Association for Health, Physical Education, Recreation, Dance and Sport (AAHPERDS)
American Association for Physical Activity and Recreation (AAPAR)
American Association for Health Education (AAHE)
National Association for Girls and Women in Sport (NAGWS)
National Association for Sport and Physical Education
National Dance Association (NDA)

The alliance at the September 2009 Board of Governor's meeting voted to move forward on motions for the exit of the American Association for Health Education and the restructuring of the National Association for Girls and Women in Sport.

National standards
Associations allied with SHAPE America have developed the following national standards.

Physical education: NASPE publishes standards for K-12 physical education, for sport coaches, and for beginning physical education teachers.
 Moving into the Future: National Standards for Physical Education, 2nd Edition: Voluntary national standards for K-12 physical education .
Quality Coaches, Quality Sports: National Standards for Sport Coaches: Fundamental competencies that athletic coaches from beginning coach to master coach should possess .
National Standards for Beginning Physical Education Teachers, 2nd Edition: Knowledge, skills, and dispositions that the beginning teacher of physical education should possess . Serve as the basis for teacher certification and program development for preparation of physical education teachers.
National Standards & Guidelines for Physical Education Teacher Education, 3rd Edition: This publication provides the knowledge, skills, and dispositions that the beginning teacher of physical education should possess. It serves as the basis for teacher certification and program development for preparation of physical education teachers.
Health education: AAHE publishes standards critical to the healthy development of children and youth.
Health Education Standards, Second Edition: National Health Education Standards provide a foundation for curriculum development, instruction, and assessment of student performance. National Health Education Standards provide a guide for enhancing preparation and continuing education of teachers.
Dance education: NDA standards were completed as part of a project developed by the Consortium of National Arts Education Associations and prepared under a grant from the U.S. Department of Education, the National Endowment for the Arts, and the National Endowment for the Humanities.
The National Standards for Dance Education: The dance standards guide content and achievement at grades K-4, 5–8, and 9–12. The standards help ensure that the study of dance is disciplined and well focused and that dance instruction has a point of reference for assessing its results.

Districts and states
SHAPE America has the following districts:

Central: Colorado, Iowa, Kansas, Minnesota, Missouri, Nebraska, North Dakota, South Dakota, Wyoming
Eastern: Connecticut, Delaware, District of Columbia, Maine, Maryland, Massachusetts, New Hampshire, New Jersey, New York, Pennsylvania, Puerto Rico, Rhode Island, Vermont, Virgin Islands
Midwest: Illinois, Indiana, Michigan, Ohio, West Virginia, Wisconsin
Western: Alaska, Arizona, California, Guam, Hawaii, Idaho, Montana, Nevada, New Mexico, Oregon, Utah, Washington
Southern: Alabama, Arkansas, Florida, Georgia, Kentucky, Louisiana, Mississippi, North Carolina, Oklahoma, South Carolina, Tennessee, Texas, Virginia

Each state has a separate association.

National convention

Information of the 1885-1950 and 1982-2008 was shared via email from the conference staff at AAHPERD.
Information of the 1950-1982 taken from conference programs collected by Lynn W. McCraw of the University of Texas at Austin
Information of the 2008–present conventions was found online through the AAHPERD website.

Programs

Let's Move in School
The goal of Let's Move in School is to ensure that every school provides a comprehensive school physical activity program with quality physical education . Let's Move in School is urging physical educators, parents, school administrators and policymakers to get involved in bringing quality physical education and physical activity to schools through a comprehensive school physical activity program.

In 2012 and again in 2016, SHAPE America published the SHAPE OF THE NATION Report : Status of Physical Education in the USA."

See also
Adapted Physical Education
Dance
Health
Health Education
National Dance Association
Physical Education
Recreation

References

Sources
Elsworth R. Buskirk. (1987). The 1986 C. H. McCloy Research Lecture Body Composition Analysis: The Past, Present and Future, Research Quarterly for Exercise and Sport, 58:1, 1–10.

External links
 

1885 establishments
Health care-related professional associations based in the United States
Medical and health organizations based in Virginia